Mildura is an electoral district of the Legislative Assembly in the Australian state of Victoria and sits within the Northern Victoria electorate. It is a 37,529 km2 rural electorate in the far-north-west of the state, encompassing the regional towns of Hopetoun, Mildura, Ouyen, Red Cliffs and Robinvale.

Mildura was first proclaimed in 1927 and was, for most of its history, a safe seat for the rural conservative Country Party, excluding two terms of Labor control from 1945 to 1947 and 1952–1955. In 1988, however, it became one of a number of rural seats to fall to the Liberal Party, with journalist Craig Bildstien winning the seat on Labor preferences. Bildstien held the seat for eight years before a surprise loss in 1996 to conservative independent Russell Savage. Savage was twice re-elected with large margins, but was a widely unexpected casualty of the 2006 election, losing his seat to the National Party's Peter Crisp in a landslide.

Crisp retained the seat in 2010 and 2014, only to be swept out in a shock defeat by Cupper, only the fourth time that the seat has not been held by a conservative party.

Towns within the district include: Birchip, Boundary Bend, Hopetoun, Irymple, Manangatang, Merbein, Mildura, Murrayville, Ouyen, Patchewollock, Piangil, Red Cliffs, Robinvale, Sea Lake, Walpeup, Woomelang and Wycheproof.

Members for Mildura

Election results

References

 District profile from the Victorian Electoral Commission

Mildura
Mildura
Mildura
Shire of Buloke
Swan Hill
Shire of Yarriambiack